Michelle M. DuBois (born April 14, 1973) is an American politician serving as a Democratic member of the Massachusetts House of Representatives. She was elected in November 2014  to represent the 10th Plymouth District (West Bridgewater, the east side of Brockton, and Precinct 1 of East Bridgewater) and was sworn in on January 7, 2015. Rep. DuBois was re-elected to a second term on November 8, 2016, after running uncontested. Rep DuBois won her third term in 2018 against John F. Cruz and won her fourth election in 2020 against Jack Lally  .

In late March 2017, Rep. DuBois worked to compromise a supposed U.S. Immigration and Customs Enforcement (ICE) a raid in Brockton, Massachusetts by posting a warning on Facebook.

In 2018 she called for a sign at the Massachusetts State House honoring General Joseph Hooker to be removed, stating that his name was a "double entendre" that was "tone deaf" and “patriarchal”.

Committees 
Rep. DuBois is currently part of the following committees:
 Joint Committee on Mental Health, Substance Use and Recovery, Vice Chair
House Committee on Steering, Policy, and Scheduling
Joint Committee on Municipalities and Regional Government
 Joint Committee on Elder Affairs

Election history

See also
 2019–2020 Massachusetts legislature
 2021–2022 Massachusetts legislature

References

External links 
 Official biography
 Official Twitter

Democratic Party members of the Massachusetts House of Representatives
Politicians from Brockton, Massachusetts
Living people
Women state legislators in Massachusetts
Massachusetts city council members
1973 births
Women city councillors in Massachusetts
21st-century American politicians
21st-century American women politicians